Angiolino is a given name and surname. Notable people with the name include:

Given name 
Angiolino Gasparini (born 1951), Italian footballer
Angiolino Romagnoli (1834–1896), Italian painter
Angiolino Bonetta (1948–1963),Italian Venerable.

Surname 
Andrea Angiolino (born 1966), game designer